Positive psychotherapy (PPT after Peseschkian, since 1977) is a psychotherapeutic method developed by psychiatrist Nossrat Peseschkian and co-workers in Germany beginning in 1968. It can be described as a humanistic psychodynamic psychotherapy, which is based on a positive conception of human nature. The focus of positive psychotherapy is to enhance the positive emotion and engagement of patients rather than targeting the depressive symptoms  PPT is an integrative method which includes humanistic, systemic, psychodynamic and CBT-elements. Today there are centers and trainings in some twenty countries worldwide. It should not be confused with positive psychology.

Beginnings
The founder of positive psychotherapy, Nossrat Peseschkian (1933–2010), was an Iranian-born German certified psychiatrist, neurologist and psychotherapist. He was inspired in the late 1960s and early 1970s by different sources, persons and developments:
 The spirit of that time, which brought into existence humanistic psychology and its further developments.
 Personal encounters with prominent psychotherapists and psychiatrists, such as Viktor Frankl, Jacob L. Moreno, Heinrich Meng and others.
 By the humanistic teachings and virtues of the Baháʼí Faith.
 By looking for an integrative method, especially because of problems between psychoanalysts and behaviour therapists at that time
 Based on transcultural observations in over 20 cultures, and searching for an integrative method which is cultur-sensitive

About founder

Nossrat Peseschkian, the founder of PPT, is intimately tied to the development of the approach, as his life history and personality heavily influenced its creation. In fact, Peseschkian has been described by his biographer as a "wanderer between two worlds" (Kornbichler T, Peseschkian M. p. 17), and his biography is fittingly subtitled "The East and the West".

According to Nossrat Peseschkian, the development of Positive Psychotherapy was motivated by his experience as an Iranian living in Europe since 1954, which made him acutely aware of the differences in behavior, customs, and attitudes between cultures. This awareness began in childhood when he observed how religious customs varied among his Moslem, Christian, and Jewish classmates and teachers as a Bahá'í. His experiences led him to reflect on the relationships between different religions and people, and to gain an understanding of attitudes as coming from worldviews and family concepts. During his medical specialization, Peseschkian witnessed confrontations between different psychiatric, neurological, and psychotherapeutic positions, which taught him the importance of discarding prejudices. These experiences helped him feel comfortable in the West, where concepts like the equality of men and women have always been a given for him. (Kornbichler T, Peseschkian M., pp. 62–63).

PPT has its roots in humanistic psychology and psychotherapy, which were pioneered by Kurt Goldstein, Abraham Maslow, and Carl Rogers. Nossrat Peseschkian was influenced by personal encounters with leading psychotherapists like Heinrich Meng, Viktor Frankl, and Jacob Levi Moreno, who left a lasting impression on him during his training. Despite these positive experiences, Peseschkian also observed the quarrels between different schools and methods in Germany, where psychoanalysts and behavior therapists refused to have lunch together. Additionally, the strong influence of psychoanalysis and its Neo-Freudian, psychosomatic, and focus-oriented developments, such as Balint, also had an impact on him. In response, Peseschkian hoped to construct a metatheory that could bridge the gaps between these different methods.

Throughout his life, Nossrat Peseschkian was also fascinated and inspired by some of the principles of the Bahá'í Faith, such as the harmony between science and religion, the belief in the inherent worth of every individual as "a mine rich in gems of inestimable value" (Bahá'u'lláh, pp. 259-260), and the vision of a global society. These principles played a significant role in his work and philosophy.

The development of Positive Psychotherapy can be attributed to several factors, including continuing medical education, experiences with patients in psychotherapeutic and psychosomatic practices, interactions with individuals from diverse cultures, religions, and value systems, and the heterogeneous nature of psychotherapy methods. 
These experiences led to the development of "Differentiational Analysis" in 1969, which was later refined and presented as Positive Psychotherapy in 1977. The titles of early books such as "Psychotherapy of Everyday Life" (1974) and "In search of meaning" (1983) illustrate the influence of psychoanalysis and existential schools of psychotherapy on Positive Psychotherapy, while the title "Positive Family Therapy" (1980) highlights its common development with systemic family therapy in the 1970s. The founder of Positive Psychotherapy, Nossrat Peseschkian, has written 29 books and numerous articles on this method.

The term "positive"
The method was called "differentiational analysis" until 1977. In 1977, Nossrat Peseschkian published his work "Positive Psychotherapie", which was published in English as "Positive Psychotherapy" in 1987. The term "positive" is derived from the original Latin expression "positum or positivus" which means the actual, the real, the concrete. The aim of positive psychotherapy and positive psychotherapists is to help the patient and client to see also their abilities, strengths, resources and potentials.

Main characteristics
 Integrative psychotherapy method
 Humanistic Psychodynamic Method
 Cohesive, integrated therapeutic system
 Conflict-centered short-term method
 Cultur-sensitive method
 Use of stories, anecdotes and wisdoms
 Innovative interventions and techniques
 Application in psychotherapy, other medical disciplines, counselling, education, prevention, management and trainings

Main principles
The three main principles or pillars of positive psychotherapy are: 
 The Principle of Hope 
 The Principle of Balance 
 The Principle of Consultation

1. The Principle of Hope implies that the therapist wants to assist patients to understand and see the meaning and purpose of their disorder or conflict. Accordingly, the disorder will be reinterpreted in a "positive" way (positive interpretations):

Some examples:
 Sleep disturbance is the ability to be watchful and get by with little sleep
 Depression is the ability to react with deepest emotionality to conflicts
 Schizophrenia is the ability to live in two worlds at the same time or to live in a fantasy world
 Anorexia nervosa is the ability to get along with few meals and identify with the hunger of the world

Through this positive view, a change of standpoint becomes possible, not only for the patient, but also for his environment. Hence, illnesses have a symbolic function which has to be recognized by both therapist and patient. The patient learns that the symptoms and complaints of the illness are signals to bring his or her four qualities of life into new balance.

2. Principle of Balance: Despite social and cultural differences and the uniqueness of every human being, it can be observed that during the management of their problems that all humans refer to typical forms of coping. Thomas Kornbichler  explains: "Nossrat Peseschkian formulated with the Balance Model of Positive Psychotherapy (an innovative contemporary approach to dynamic psychotherapy) a vivid model of coping with conflicts in different cultures."  According to the balance model, the four areas of life are: 1. body/health – psychosomatic; 2. achievement/work – stress factors; 3. contact/relationships – depression; 4. future/purpose/meaning of life – fears and phobia.

Though these four ranges are inherent in all humans, in the western hemisphere the emphasis is more often on the areas of body/senses and profession/achievement in contrast to the eastern hemisphere where the areas are contact, fantasy and future (cross-cultural aspect of positive psychotherapy). Lack of contact and imagination are some of the causes of many psychosomatic diseases. Everyone develops his or her own preferences on how to cope with conflicts that occur. Through a one-sided mode to the conflict solution, the other modes become eclipsed. 
The conflict contents (e.g. punctuality, orderliness, politeness, trust, time, patience) are described in terms of primary and secondary capacities, based on the basic capacities of loving and knowing. This can be seen as a content-wise differentiation of Freud's classical model of the instances.

3. Principle of Consultation: Five-stages of therapy and self-help. The five stages of positive psychotherapy represent a concept in which therapy and self-help are closely interrelated. The patient and the family are informed together about the illness and the individual solution to it.
 1st Step: Observation; distancing (perception: the capacity to express desire and problems)
 2nd Step: Taking inventory (cognitive capacities: events in the last 5 to 10 years)
 3rd Step: Situational encouragement (self-help and resource-activation of the patient: the ability to use past successes in conflict solution)
 4th Step: Verbalization (communicative capacities: the ability to express outstanding conflicts and problems in the four qualities of life)
 5th Step: Expansion of goals (in order to evoke forward–looking orientation in life after the problems are solved, the patient is asked: "What would you like to do, when no more problems are left to be solved? What are your goals for the next five years?")

Positive approach
Positive Psychotherapy emphasizes the mobilization of existing capacities and potential for self-help instead of primarily focusing on eliminating existing disturbances. The therapy begins with the possibilities for development and capacities of the individuals involved(Peseschkian N., pp. 1–7), following the approach of Maslow who coined the term "positive psychology"  to highlight the importance of focusing on positive qualities in people. Symptoms and disorders are viewed as reactions to conflicts, and the therapy is called "positive" because it recognizes the wholeness of the individuals involved, including both the pathogenesis of illness and the salutogenesis of joys, capacities, resources, potentials, and possibilities. (Jork K, Peseschkian N., p. 13).

The term "positive" in Positive Psychotherapy is based on the "positive sciences" concept (based on Max Weber, 1988), which means a judgment-free description of the observed phenomenon. Nossrat Peseschkian uses the term "positum" in a broader sense, meaning that which is available, given, or actual. This positive aspect of the illness is just as important for the understanding and clinical treatment of the affliction as the negative aspect. The therapy aims to mobilize existing capacities and potential for self-help and focuses on the possibilities for development and capacities of the individuals involved, rather than just treating them as a "bag of symptoms." Peseschkian believes that symptoms and disorders are reactions to conflicts, and the therapy is called "positive" because it proceeds from the concept of the wholeness of the persons involved as a given.

The concept of "capacity" is a fundamental aspect of Positive Psychotherapy and is based on a positive image of human beings. This concept is applied throughout the therapy, such as viewing an illness as an expression of the capacity to react to a conflict or as the capacity to be unique. Additionally, it views an illness as either a capacity to return to health or be overcome by it. The specific capacities that are hidden within the conflict are also considered. One of the unique features of this method is that the concepts and explanatory models used are easily understandable by all patients.

The Positive Image of Human Beings and the Positive Interpretation of Disorders

The concept of Positive Psychotherapy is based on a humanistic view of human nature, which emphasizes the inherent goodness and potential of individuals. According to PPT, people have two basic capacities: to love and to know, and through education and personal development, they can further develop these capacities and their unique personalities. Therapy, in this context, is seen as a tool for promoting further growth and education for the patient and their family.

Viewed from a positive perspective, illnesses can be perceived as a way of coping with conflicts that were often acquired during childhood. In this context, disorders are seen as imbalanced reactions to the limited concepts and capacities available at the time. By expanding these concepts and developing capacities into skills, new internal models are formed that broaden the previous one-sided perceptions, thoughts, expectations, and behaviors, opening up new possibilities.

In Positive Psychotherapy, disorders are reframed in a positive light. Depression, for instance, is viewed as “the capacity to react to conflicts with deep emotionality”; fear of loneliness is seen as “the desire to be with other people”; alcoholism is reinterpreted as “the capacity to supply oneself with warmth (and love) that is not received from others”; psychosis is considered as “the capacity to live in two worlds at the same time”; and cardiac disorders are seen as “the capacity to hold something very close to one’s heart”.

The positive process involved in PPT results in a shift in perspective for all parties involved, including the patient, their family, and the therapist/physician. Instead of focusing solely on the symptom, attention is directed towards the underlying conflict. Furthermore, this approach allows for the identification of the "real patient”, who is often not the one seeking treatment, but rather a member of their social environment. By interpreting illnesses in a positive light, patients are encouraged to understand the potential function and psychodynamic significance of their illness for themselves and those around them, and to recognize their abilities rather than just their pathologies.

Development and international network
The main emphasis of positive psychotherapy during the past 40 years has been treatment, training and publication.
 In 1979, the Wiesbaden Postgraduate Training Institute for Psychotherapy and Family Therapy was established as a postgraduate training for physicians in Wiesbaden, Germany. In 1999, the Wiesbaden Academy for Psychotherapy (WIAP), a state-licensed, postgraduate psychotherapy academy with a large outpatient clinic, was established for the training of psychologists and educational scientists. 
 Most Positive Psychotherapists work in private offices or in clinics. In Germany, Positive Psychotherapy is counted as a psychodynamic method and the health insurance covers the costs.
 Since the early 1980s, seminars and trainings have taken place in some 60 countries. Today, Positive Psychotherapy is practiced in more than 25  countries with approximately 30 independent centres and institutions. The training programs for mental health professionals consist of basic and master trainings over several years.
 The international head office is based in Wiesbaden, Germany. Positive psychotherapy is represented internationally by the World Association of Positive and Transcultural Psychotherapy (WAPP). Its international governing board of directors is elected every two years. There are national and regional associations in some ten countries.
 PPT and its therapists have been engaged in the international development of psychotherapy, and are active members of international and continental associations

Publications and research
 In 1997, a quality assurance and effectiveness study was undertaken in Germany. The results show this short-term method to be effective. The study was awarded the Richard-Merten-Prize. 
 Today there are more than 30 major books on positive psychotherapy, of which some have been published in more than 23 languages. Some of the main ones are:
 
  (translated) (first German edition 1977)
  (First German edition 1979)
  (first German edition 1983)
 , republished India: Sterling Publishers Pvt., Ltd.,  (first German edition 1980)
  (first German edition 1974)
 Maxim Goncharov, Operationalization of countertransference in Positive Psychotherapy. International Journal of Psychotherapy, Vol 16, No 3, Article 4
 Maksim Goncharov, Conflict operationalization in Positive Psychotherapy, Khabarovsk, Russia, 2014.

See also
 Nossrat Peseschkian
 Positive psychology

References

External links
 World Association for Positive and Transcultural Psychotherapy
 PPT Education Information
 International Academy information
 OxNotes Education Information

Counseling
Psychodynamic psychotherapy